Go Yeong-chang (born 21 March 1926) was a South Korean weightlifter. He competed in the men's middleweight event at the 1960 Summer Olympics in Rome, Italy.

References

External links
 

1926 births
Possibly living people
South Korean male weightlifters
Olympic weightlifters of South Korea
Weightlifters at the 1960 Summer Olympics
Sportspeople from Seoul
20th-century South Korean people